Dictymia brownii, known as the strap fern, is a species of fern found in and near rainforest in eastern Australia. It is usually seen hanging from branches, or growing on rocks. There is a surprising record of this plant in the northern Sydney suburb of Berowra.
This species was named in honour of the Scottish botanist, Robert Brown.

References

Flora of New South Wales
Flora of Queensland
Polypodiaceae